Associazione Calcio Sangiustese is an Italian association football club located in Monte San Giusto, Marche. It plays in Serie D.

History 
It was founded in 1956 and played in 2008–09 Lega Pro Seconda Divisione, after having been crowned as Serie D/F winners in 2007–08.

In July 2010, because the club did not fulfill the financial requirement, it was expelled from professional league and restarted from Eccellenza.

In the next season in Eccellenza Marche the club was relegated to Promozione and dissolved in the summer 2011.

Colors and badge 
The team's colours are red and blue.

References

External links
Sangiustese page @ Serie-D.com

Football clubs in Italy
Association football clubs established in 1956
Football clubs in the Marche
Serie C clubs
1956 establishments in Italy